Młynary is a town in Warmian-Masurian Voivodeship (north Poland).

Młynary may also refer to:

Młynary, Lower Silesian Voivodeship (south-west Poland)
Młynary, Greater Poland Voivodeship (west-central Poland)
Młynary, Łódź Voivodeship (central Poland)
Młynary, West Pomeranian Voivodeship (north-west Poland)